The Lorenzo Hubbell Trading Post and Warehouse is located in the western part of the historic center of the city of Winslow, in Navajo County, Arizona.

The building was built in 1917. It was listed on the National Register of Historic Places in 2002, in the Winslow Historic District. It currently serves as the Winslow visitor center.

History
The building was constructed by Hubert and Richardson in 1917. It was bought by Don Lorenzo Hubbell in 1921 and turned into a trading post for goods exchange with Navajo. It was one of about thirty trading posts owned by Hubbell and his family, and one of the two wholesale stores (another one was located in Gallup, New Mexico).

In 2002, it was restored and became a western gateway to the Winslow Historic District.

See also
Hubbell Trading Post National Historic Site
La Posada Historic District — also in Winslow.
National Register of Historic Places listings in Navajo County, Arizona

References

External links

Trading posts in the United States
Winslow, Arizona
Buildings and structures in Navajo County, Arizona
Commercial buildings completed in 1917
Commercial buildings on the National Register of Historic Places in Arizona
Industrial buildings completed in 1917
National Register of Historic Places in Navajo County, Arizona
1917 establishments in Arizona